Wilmya Zimmermann (born 30 July 1944) is a German politician who served in the European Parliament from 1994 to 1999.

Biography
Wilmya Zimmermann, who was born on 30 July 1944 in Heerlen, Netherlands, attended secondary school and was trained as and later became a Medical Technician Assistant in a Heerlen hospital and the Radboud University Nijmegen. In 1970 she moved to Germany to take up an employment at the University of Marburg. She was later transferred into the University of Erlangen–Nuremberg.

In 1986 Zimmermann joined the Public Services, Transport and Traffic Union. She is a member of Europa-Union Deutschland

Zimmerman was married at some point before 1999.

Politics
In 1988 Zimmermann joined the Social Democratic Party of Germany, and she is the treasurer of the party's Bamberg-Forchheim division.

She was elected to the European Parliament in 1994, and served as a member until 1999. She worked on the committee with diplomatic relations with Romania and Bulgaria. She was the first MEP to be elected in a country of which she did not have citizenship.

References

1944 births
Living people
People from Heerlen
Social Democratic Party of Germany MEPs
MEPs for Germany 1994–1999
Dutch expatriates in Germany
Radboud University Nijmegen alumni
Academic staff of the University of Marburg
Academic staff of the University of Erlangen-Nuremberg